Saravanampatti is a neighborhood of the Coimbatore city. It lies on the north-eastern part of the city. Saravanampatti is one of the fast-growing neighbourhoods of Coimbatore, because of the proliferation of IT companies in areas such as Saravanampatti, Peelamedu, Keeranatham, Vilankurichi, Kalapatti. Saravanampatti has been part of Coimbatore Corporation since 2011.

Demographics
 India census, Saravanampatti has a population of 33,000. Males constitute 52% of the population and females 48%. Saravanampatti has an average literacy rate of 78%, higher than the national average of 59.5%: male literacy is 83%, and female literacy is 72%. In Saravanampatti, 10% of the population is under 6 years of age.

Geography
The nerve centre of Saravanampatti is Sathy Road. Other major roads include New Keeranatham road, Athipalayam road and Sankara College road and Saravanampatti- Thudiyalur road. It is located about 12.4 km from Townhall, the centre of the city, 
11 km from the Coimbatore International Airport and about 11.5 km from City railway station, 9 km from Gandhipuram Central Bus Terminus and 16 km from Podanur railway station and is well connected to local bus services to various parts of the city. Saravanampatti shares its border with Ganapathy, Vilankurichi, Cheranmanagar, Kurumbalayam and Thudiyalur.

Saravanampatti Flyover
A  two - lane flyover is proposed at Saravanampatti to reduce traffic congestion.

Economy 

Saravanampatti has now emerged as the "IT Corridor of Coimbatore", with the region housing a large share of IT businesses at Coimbatore. Around 50,000 IT Professionals are working out of just Saravanampatti in Coimbatore, of which Cognizant employs close to 14,000 & Bosch employs around 5,500. Hirotec India Private Limited and CRI pumps are the manufacturing companies.

Administration
 Sub-Registrar Office, Saravanampatti

Coimbatore Metro 
Coimbatore Metro has proposed a Metro corridor from Ganeshapuram, near Annur via Saravanampatti through Sathy Road till Karunya Nagar 44 km.

Politics 
The locality of Saravanampatti is a part of Kavundampalayam (state assembly constituency) and Coimbatore (Lok Sabha constituency).

References

Cities and towns in Coimbatore district
Neighbourhoods in Coimbatore